The Western Australian Alcohol and Drug Authority is a Western Australian authority that commenced operation on 1 January 1974.
	
The Authority was established under the Western Australian Alcohol and Drug Authority Act of 1974 for the treatment, management, care and rehabilitation of people suffering from alcohol and drug abuse in Western Australia.

The Authority has undertaken research and provided educational facilities directed at alcohol and drug abuse.  Various members of the authority have at times declared publicly their attitude towards evidence of alcohol abuse in Australia and the authority has had as part of its activity, concern about the criminalization of drunkenness.
A range of people worked for the authority as social workers or other professional roles during their careers, including Kay Hallahan.

It has also provided materials assisting people requiring help.

The Authority also manages rehabilitation centres.

Publications

Notes

External links
 Drug and Alcohol office, the office of the Western Australian Alcohol and Drug Authority

Statutory agencies of Western Australia
Alcohol in Australia
Drugs in Australia